Frederik Hansen (11 September 1885 – 23 January 1981) was a Danish wrestler who competed in the lightweight event at the 1912 Summer Olympics.

References

External links
 

1885 births
1981 deaths
Olympic wrestlers of Denmark
Wrestlers at the 1912 Summer Olympics
Danish male sport wrestlers
People from Gladsaxe Municipality
Sportspeople from the Capital Region of Denmark
20th-century Danish people